A malt drink is a fermented drink in which the primary ingredient is the grain, or seed, of the barley plant, which has been allowed to sprout slightly in a traditional way called "malting" before it is processed.

By far the most predominant malt drink is beer (naturally fermented barley sugars flavoured with hops), of which there are two main styles: ale and lager. A low alcohol level drink brewed in this fashion is technically identical to "non-alcoholic beer". Such a drink may be prepared by using a slightly altered brewing process that yields negligible alcohol (technically less than 0.5% by volume). These are called low-alcohol beers or "near beers".

In the United States, the term "malt beverage" may be used by trade associations of groups of beer wholesalers (e.g. Tennessee Malt Beverages Association) for the sake of a professional image by using brewing craft related terms, for political or legal reasons, or to avoid potential negative connotations that may be associated with beer in a region.  Additionally, the term malt beverage is applied to many other flavoured drinks prepared from malted grains to which natural or artificial flavours (and sometimes colours) have been added to make them taste and appear similar to wines, fruits, colas, natural ciders, or other drinks. This subcategory has been called "malternative", as in Smirnoff Ice (US and French version), or "maltini", as in 3SUM, which also has energy components like caffeine. Marketing of such products in the United States has increased rapidly in recent years. In most jurisdictions, these products are regulated in a way identical to beer, which allows a retailer with a beer license to sell a wider product line. This also generally avoids the steeper taxes and stricter regulations associated with distilled spirits.

Non-alcoholic malt drinks
Beer-style
 Barbican (Middle East)
 Julmust (Sweden)
 Kvass (Northeastern, Central and Eastern Europe)
 Malta (Germany and Denmark)
 Podpiwek (Poland and Lithuania)
 Supermalt (Afro-Caribbean and UK)
 ISTAK (Iran)
 Hoppy (Japan)

Milk-style
 Horlicks (UK)
 Malted milk
 Milkshake
 Milo (Australia and Southeast Asia)
 Ovaltine (UK)

Low-alcoholic malt drinks
 Low-alcohol beers
 Malt beer
 Malzbier
 Wine cooler

Average-alcoholic malt drinks
 Alcopop
 Malt beer
 Malt liquor

High-alcoholic malt drinks
 Malt whisky
 Single malt whisky
 Blended malt whisky

See also

List of barley-based drinks

External links

Types of beer
Fermented drinks
Alcohol law